The Piper Mountain Wilderness is a federally designated wilderness area located in the White Mountains  northeast of Big Pine, California in Inyo County, California.

The Wilderness Area was created by the 1994 California Desert Protection Act, and encompasses  of Great Basin wildlands, east of the Owens Valley and west of the Eureka Valley.

Geography

The landscape is characterized by steep mountains, narrow canyons, sloping alluvial fans and level floodplains. It includes a subrange of the Inyo Mountains called the Chocolate Mountains, a northwestern section of the Last Chance Range and the upper end of Eureka Valley which is immediately north of Death Valley National Park.

The highest peaks of the wilderness are in the Chocolate Mountains  and include Mount Nunn (7,815 feet) and Lime Hill (6,532 feet).

Topography 
The vehicle corridors that break the continuity of the Piper Wilderness Area into three parts were a concession made when the area was added to the California Desert Protection Act. 
 The western section is the largest of the three and includes the east side, the steep west side and the crest of the Chocolate Mountains subrange.
 The central section is separated from the western portion by a road linking State Route 168 to Death Valley Road. A colorful and deeply dissected bahada rising to a subrange of the Last Chance Mountains characterize the central section.
 The third and smallest section of the wilderness is separated from the central portion by Loretto Mine Road and Horse Thief Canyon and is a continuation of the Last Chance subrange with its border being the Eureka Valley Road and Death Valley National Park.

Flora and fauna

Desert vegetation include xeric shrublands of Creosote bush (Larrea tridentata) in the lower valleys. North-facing high elevation slopes are studded with Single-leaf Pinyon (Pinus monophylla) and California juniper (Juniperus californica).

Within the wilderness grows one of the northernmost stands of Joshua Tree (Yucca brevifolia), at the base of the Inyo Mountains.

Rare wildflowers include  black milkvetch or Funeral Mountain milkvetch (Astragalus funereus), and the cactus Redspined fishhook cactus or Mojave fish hook cactus (Sclerocactus polyancistrus), which grows in Joshua tree "woodland" communities.

There are three areas within the wilderness that are habitat for the Desert Bighorn Sheep.

Recreation
Recreational  opportunities are day-hiking and backpacking with solitude almost guaranteed as the wilderness is very lightly used. The Bureau of Land Management  oversees the Piper Wilderness and does not require any permits for visitors.

Water and recreation 
Water is the single most limiting factor when exploring this desert wilderness.  Caching water is possible in many locations because of the road corridors through the area. The majority of visitors are students from Deep Springs College in Deep Springs Valley, located between highway 168 and the western edge of the wilderness.

Most often hiked is the deep notch of the Soldier Pass Canyon which extends east to west in the Chocolate Mountains. Maps dating to 1879 show a "Soldier Pass" label.

The Bureau of Land Management (BLM) encourages the practice of Leave No Trace principles of wilderness travel to help protect the fragile desert environment.

See also
 Eureka Valley Sand Dunes
 Great Basin Desert
 Category: Protected areas of the Mojave Desert
 Category: Flora of the California desert regions
 Environmental ethics

Footnotes

References
 Adkinson, Ron  Wild Northern California-A guide to forty-one roadless areas including the entire Sierra  Nevada. Globe Piquet Press, 2001
  BLM Official website on the Piper Mountain Wilderness.

External links
Piper Mountain Wilderness - BLM
California Desert District Ridgecrest Field Office - BLM
Piper Mountain Wilderness - Wilderness Connect

Wilderness areas of California
Protected areas of the Mojave Desert
Protected areas of Inyo County, California
Inyo Mountains
Bureau of Land Management areas in California
Protected areas established in 1994
1994 establishments in California